Peter Malcolm "Pete" Kovachevich, also known as Peter Savant, is an American guitar player, singer, songwriter and photographer. He is known for his bluesy and aggressive style, reminiscent to Stevie Ray Vaughan and Jimi Hendrix.  He has played with popular jam bands like Blues Traveler, Spin Doctors, and Warren Haynes, and he became a staple in the New York jam scene, playing Fridays at a small club, Nightingales, with his bands First House and Kindred Spirit.

Early years 
Kovachevich is from the south side of Chicago, Illinois. He started playing with the sons of Chicago jazz master Ramsey Lewis in the 1980s, having met Frayne and Bobby Lewis at Chicago High School of Performing Arts.

Musical career
Kovachevich started his first band, Channel Red, while still in high school. The band featured Ronnie Reporto on vocals from Chicago's State Theater production of Jesus Christ Superstar.  Along with Frayne, Bobby, and Kovachevich, Channel Red enjoyed success. By age 17, Kovachevich already had performed for large crowds including the Taste of Chicago festival. After Reporto left Chicago to attend college, Kovachevich decided to leave Channel Red and relocate to New York City, join his father, after living in Chicago with his mother.

Kindred Spirit 
Playing bass and guitar in many bands, he quickly formed a new group. Kovachevich's first band in New York City was Kindred Spirit. It was the first of Kovachevich's bands to play at the Nightingale bar.

Kindred Spirit was founded in 1990 by Ted Meyer (drums), J. Jorrin (bass) Sheldon Landa (piano) and Kovachevich (guitar). KS was handed down a tues. night that was famous for nurturing huge names. Kindred Spirit enjoyed the endorsement and played with several NYC jam band scene Illuminati including God Street Wine, The Authority, Spin Doctors, Widespread Panic, Phish, The Worms, The Jono Manson Band, Xanax 25, Milo Z, Comfort, Blues Traveler, Gov't Mule, The Dreyer Bros, The Choosy Mothers, innerSoul. This period of time marks an era in NYC, when there were several live music venues and a vibrant scene of bands and styles. This was from 1991 to 1996. Kindred Spirit featured Sheldon Landa on Piano and had a very piano dominant sound in their jams, yet maintained the classic Kovachevich, funky original rock sound. Having some problems keeping Kindred Spirit together, in 1996, Bass player David Hamburger quit Kindred Spirit to join The Dreyer Bros and Kovachevich brought on Jack Desantis on bass from Xanax 25. Kindred Spirit's drummer was Neil Nunziato Later in 2001, "Kindred Spirit Maui" was reformed with Eddy S on Bass and Kris Thomas on the drums. Kovachevich and long-time friend Eddy S released "Kindred Spirit Maui" in 2004, an endeavor that was recorded by the two of them alone.

Playing with Blues Traveler
Kovachevich traveled on tour with Blues Traveler for nine weeks. He also played on Blues Traveler's album, Four, playing sitar, tambura, shruti box and other instruments.

First House 
After a successful tour with Blues Traveler, Kovachevich quit Kindred Spirit after the tour. When asked why, Kovachevich replied during an interview after a gig at the then popular music club Wetlands Preserve, "I want to explore the possibilities of playing with a three piece, power trio, like my influences did" and so began The First House which featured Pawel Maciwoda on bass and David Schlossberg from the Dreyer Bros. on drums. It was a personal triumph for Kovachevich to steal the Dreyer Bros. drummer from them after they stole Kindred Spirit's bass player. First House did bold spontaneous shows on the street all over the states and most notably in New Orleans during Mardi Gras, where they also played with The Radiators. First House was known to attract massive crowds on the street and police would often show up and break up the shows, one time leaving the band without any equipment and a crowd of angry fans screaming "let them play" Kovachevich was forced to subdue the crowd, begging them to please go home and let the police take their equipment. FH never was given back their amps, mikes and PA from NYCPD.  Pavel Macivoda was in First House from 1996 to 1997 at which time he was kicked out of the band due to his wild and aggressive behavior with female fans. In 1997, long-time friend of both David and Kovachevich, Kenji Hino joined First House on stage as the full-time bass player. It was this lineup that became the notorious late night First House, with shows known to start at 1 or 2 am and go until 5 am.  First House released an album, First House. It was recorded at the Power Station recording studio, where Stevie Ray recorded his album Couldn't Stand the Weather.

First House broke up shortly after their road manager was found dead by Kovachevich one early morning after a gig. Everyone tried to carry on after this event, but it later proved too difficult to ignore. First House also was plagued with several other unfortunate problems that prevented Kovachevich and FH to gain the ground they so very much deserved. First House played their last gig in NYC @ Nightingales, Sept. 1999. Rumors of a reunion have been floating around for sometime, but Kenji Hino now lives in Japan permanently.

Photography 
Kovachevich is also an established photographer, using the name Peter Savant for it as well as for his music. His style includes nighttime photos, lomography and pinhole cameras. He spent 10 years in Maui, Hawaii, shooting fashion, sports, nudes, and fine art. He has a photo website and blog dedicated to his photos.

Personal life 
Kovachevich resides in Northern California. He also has lived in Chicago and New York City, and he lived in Maui for 10 years.

Kovachevich has used a stage name, Peter Savant, for his photography and some of his music. It has been speculated as to why he changed his name to "Savant" or why he calls himself that, on his website, he calls himself an "Idiot Savant."

References

External links
Official website

Singers from Chicago
Living people
American male guitarists
American rock guitarists
American male singer-songwriters
American photographers
Guitarists from Chicago
Year of birth missing (living people)
Singer-songwriters from Illinois